Michael Oneal Mayes (born August 17, 1966) is a former American football defensive back who played professionally in the National Football League (NFL).

Mayes was born in DeRidder, Louisiana and attended DeRidder High School. He played collegiately at LSU and was drafted by the New Orleans Saints in the 4th round of the 1989 NFL Draft, the 106th overall pick.

Mayes played for the Saints, the New York Jets, and the Minnesota Vikings during his three year NFL Career.

References

Living people
1966 births
American football defensive backs
LSU Tigers football players
New Orleans Saints players
New York Jets players
Minnesota Vikings players
People from DeRidder, Louisiana